Minister for Commerce and Industrial Relations is a position in the government of Western Australia, currently held by Sue Ellery of the Labor Party. The position was first created after the 1993 state election, for the government of Richard Court. The minister is responsible for the state government's Department of Commerce.

The current Minister for Commerce and Industrial Relations holds responsibilities that were previously given to several separate ministers – the Minister for Works (abolished 2001), Minister for Labour (abolished 2001), and Minister for Consumer Affairs (abolished 2008).

List of commerce ministers
Titles
 16 February 1993 – 16 February 2001: Minister for Commerce and Trade
 23 September 2008 – 17 March 2017: Minister for Commerce
 17 March 2017 – unknown: Minister for Commerce and Industrial Relations
 Unknown – present: Minister for Commerce

List of works ministers
Titles
 29 December 1890 – 27 May 1901: Director of Public Works
 27 May 1901 – 16 April 1924: Minister for Works
 16 April 1924 – 20 August 1936: Minister for Public Works
 20 August 1936 – 25 February 1986: Minister for Works
 25 February 1986 – 5 February 1991: Minister for Works and Services
 5 February 1991 – 16 February 1993: Minister for Construction
 16 February 1993 – 1 July 2001: Minister for Works

List of labour ministers
Titles
 10 August 1904 – 25 August 1905: Minister for Labour
 25 August 1905 – 16 September 1910: Minister for Commerce and Labour
 16 April 1924 – 8 April 1974: Minister for Labour
 8 April 1974 – 25 February 1983: Minister for Labour and Industry
 25 February 1983 – 16 March 1987: Minister for Industrial Relations
 16 March 1987 – 19 February 1990: Minister for Labour
 19 February 1990 – 16 February 1993: Minister for Productivity and Labour Relations
 16 February 1993 – 1 July 2001: Minister for Labour Relations

List of consumer affairs ministers
Titles
 7 October 1949 – 13 May 1954: Minister for Prices
 3 March 1971 – 8 April 1974: Minister for Prices Control and Minister for Consumer Protection (two titles)
 8 April 1974 – 3 November 1993: Minister for Consumer Affairs
 3 November 1993 – 16 February 2001: Minister for Fair Trading
 16 February 2001 – 1 July 2001: Minister for Consumer Affairs
 1 July 2001 – 3 February 2006: Minister for Consumer and Employment Protection
 3 February 2006 – 23 September 2008: Minister for Consumer Protection

See also
 Treasurer of Western Australia
 Minister for Finance (Western Australia)
 Minister for Housing (Western Australia)
 Minister for Small Business (Western Australia)
 Minister for State Development (Western Australia)

References
 David Black (2014), The Western Australian Parliamentary Handbook (Twenty-Third Edition). Perth [W.A.]: Parliament of Western Australia.

Commerce
Minister for Commerce
1993 establishments in Australia